Armadillo repeat protein deleted in velo-cardio-facial syndrome is a protein that in humans is encoded by the ARVCF gene.

Function 

Armadillo repeat gene deleted in Velo-Cardio-Facial syndrome (ARVCF) is a member of the catenin family which play an important role in the formation of adherens junction complexes, which are thought to facilitate communication between the inside and outside environments of a cell. ARVCF gene was isolated in the search for the genetic defect responsible for the autosomal dominant Velo-Cardio-Facial syndrome (VCFS) a relatively common human disorder with phenotypic features including cleft palate, conotruncal heart defects and facial dysmorphology.  ARVCF gene encodes a protein containing two motifs, a coiled coil domain in the N-terminus and a 10 armadillo repeat sequence in the midregion. Since these sequences can facilitate protein-protein interactions ARVCF is thought to function in a protein complex.  In addition, ARVCF contains a predicted nuclear-targeting sequence suggesting that it may have a function as a nuclear protein.

Interactions 
ARVCF has been shown to interact with CDH15.

References

External links

Further reading